William Baker Rock (August 5, 1872 – June 27, 1922) was a vaudeville comedian and dancer. He was a partner with Maude Fulton in the vaudeville act of Rock and Fulton. He later was a partner with Frances White (1898–1969) as Rock and White.

Biography
He was born on August 5, 1872 in Evansville, Indiana to William Beverly Rock and Matilda Baker. He married Jane Ryder on October 5, 1905 in Manhattan, New York City. He married Gladys Tilbury of Brighton, England. On July 6, 1921 he married Helen Eby of Altoona, Pennsylvania. She appeared with him in Hitchy-Koo. On July 13, 1921 he was hospitalized and had one-third of his stomach removed. He died on June 27, 1922 at the National Stomach Hospital in Philadelphia, Pennsylvania of cancer of the stomach. He was buried in Fairview Cemetery in Bowling Green, Kentucky.

References

1872 births
1922 deaths
19th-century American dancers
Deaths from cancer in Pennsylvania
Comedians from Indiana
Vaudeville performers
20th-century American dancers
American male dancers
20th-century American comedians